Presidential elections were held in El Salvador on 30 April 1962. Julio Adalberto Rivera Carballo of the National Conciliation Party was the sole candidate and was elected unopposed.

Results

References

Bibliography
Anderson, Thomas P. Matanza: El Salvador's communist revolt of 1932. Lincoln: University of Nebraska Press. 1971.
Benítez Manaut, Raúl. "El Salvador: un equilibrio imperfecto entre los votos y las botas." Secuencia 17:71-92 (mayo-agosto de 1990). 
Eguizábal, Cristina. "El Salvador: elecciones sin democracia." Polemica (Costa Rica) 14/15:16-33 (marzo-junio 1984). 1984.
Kantor, Harry. Patterns of politics and political systems in Latin America. Chicago: Rand McNally & Company. 1969.
Political Handbook of the world, 1962. New York, 1963. 
Schooley, Helen. Conflict in Central America. Harlow: Longman. 1987.
Williams, Philip J. and Knut Walter. Militarization and demilitarization in El Salvador's transition to democracy. Pittsburgh: University of Pittsburgh Press. 1997.

El Salvador
Presidential elections in El Salvador
1962 in El Salvador
Single-candidate elections
Election and referendum articles with incomplete results